9HD is an Australian television channel owned by Nine Entertainment, originally launched on 17 March 2008 featuring unique "breakaway" programming until 2009 and a high-definition simulcast of the Nine Network from 2009 to 2010 and again since 26 November 2015. The channel is available on high definition digital television viewers in metropolitan and regional areas through a number of owned-and-operated and affiliate stations. Originally 9HD only simulcast blocks of programming from the Nine Network, and in 2008 it added time-shifted news, movies, drama and entertainment programs.  Following the launch of 9Go! in August 2009, 9HD reverted to a HD simulcast of the Nine Network. The channel was replaced completely in 2010 and the space occupied by the newly launched multichannel 9Gem. Following the government's decision to remove the SD Primary Channel limitations, the channel returned as a HD simulcast on channel 90 on 26 November 2015.

History

Origins
Digital broadcasting proposals in the 1990s always envisioned a high-definition service for each network, and to that end, Nine Network was allocated its own entire DVB-T multiplex.  However, late amendments to the Broadcasting Services Act 1992 added a mandate for simulcasting in standard definition, while still promoting high definition through the use of a quota in 2003, requiring a minimum number of hours of native HDTV content.

From the launch of digital TV on 01/01/01, the Nine Network's high definition service, a simulcast of its standard definition and analogue services, was heavily simulcasting Nine's standard definition content upconverted to HD. From 2002, this was interspersed with a loop of high definition demonstration material during business hours, for viewing in the showrooms of television retailers, at the conclusion of an equivalent service by Network Ten.

2002 saw the first revenue-generating broadcast in native HD in Australia, with the drama Judging Amy.  Nine increased its native HD output in the lead-up to the commencement of the HD quota on July 1, 2003, from which point it broadcast a minimum of 1,040 hours of native HD content per year.  The largest portion of this was The Today Show.

Breakaway era
9HD was officially announced as a part-time (or "breakaway") multichannel on 27 September 2007, to replace the Nine Network's existing high definition simulcast service through the use of an amendment to the Broadcasting Services Act 1992 in 2006. The Broadcasting Legislation Amendment (Digital television) Act 2006 permitted television networks to launch digital multichannels, provided that they are broadcast exclusively in high definition.

Although originally expected to be the first free-to-air commercial television channel introduced to metropolitan areas since 1988, the surprise launch of rival Seven HD, on 15 October 2007, one month before transmissions were scheduled to begin meant that 9HD was not the first high definition multichannel in Australia. Following this, plans for a November launch in 2007 were postponed until 2008. On 10 March 2008, PBL Media announced that it would launch the channel on 17 March 2008 at 10:30pm, with its first program, Nightline.

Opening night
The re-branded 9HD officially commenced transmission on 17 March 2008 from PBL Media's four metropolitan owned-and-operated stations, TCN Sydney, GTV Melbourne, QTQ Brisbane and NTD Darwin, in addition to WIN Corporation's two metropolitan stations NWS Adelaide, and STW Perth as well as on its regional stations RTQ Queensland, WIN southern New South Wales, VTV Victoria, and TVT Tasmania. The first official program on launch night began at 10:30pm, Nine News's late-night news program Nightline. This was followed by military drama E-Ring at 11:00pm, with the movie Unanswered Questions marking the end of the first night of exclusive transmission for 9HD after its conclusion at 2am.

Full simulcast and launch of 9Gem
All 9HD breakaway programming ceased transmission on Sunday 2 August 2009 in preparation for the launch of GO! (now 9Go!) on 9 August. As a result, 9HD was reverted to an HD simulcast of Nine's main channel.

9HD was replaced by the GEM (now 9Gem) multichannel on 26 September 2010, which unlike the previous incarnation, was a full-time breakaway and branded separately (with one exception being the London Olympics).  This removed the HD simulcast of Channel Nine entirely to allow a third channel to fit on Nine's DVB-T multiplex (due to technical and regulatory limitations).  As a result, Nine lost the majority of its youth, news and comedy content in HD, but also screened female, crime and lifestyle content on its only HD facility.

For the purposes of some sport such as cricket, GEM was still used on an occasional basis to broadcast HD under the Wide World of Sports brand, though not necessarily as a simulcast with Nine.  As such, this was generally limited to events outside of prime time, while those with more prominence continued to be shown on the Nine Network.

2015 revival
On 26 November 2015, Nine recommenced simulcasting in HD on channel 90. As a result, 9Gem was moved to channel 92 and reduced to standard definition.

This revival marked 9HD's switch to H.264/MPEG-4 AVC broadcasting, allowing the broadcaster to operate at full quality in 1920x1080i50 resolution using a lower bitrate than in 2007. This gives the network the ability to provide all the other multichannel services launched since 2009, such as 9Go!, at the same time.

Programming

Other than during the 2008-2010 period of 9HD as a breakaway service, the channel has been a broadcast of simulcast content from Nine's main channel 'Nine' in high definition. However, in the 2008-2010 period, exclusive breakaway programming was broadcast for several hours a day, usually from 10.30pm til around 2am the next morning most nights of the week. During other hours, 9HD remained a simulcast of Nine.

In May 2009, in addition to late night breakaways, 9HD marked changes to its daytime schedule with the addition of breakaway programs between 11am and 4.30pm. The new-look daytime schedule featured a midday movie and repeats of Bewitched and I Dream of Jeannie.

Exclusive programming which aired during breakaways on the channel included Comedy Inc. (reruns only), E-Ring, The Mountain, Related, Invasion, Four Kings, The Comeback, Big Day, Twenty Good Years, Hot Properties, Happy Hour, Kidnapped, Notes from the Underbelly and a few episodes of Justice. 9HD also broadcast most of Nine Melbourne's football-themed programming, notably Footy Classified and the AFL version of The Footy Show to a national audience.

Availability

Original channel
In its former inception, 9HD was available in 1080i50 high definition through Nine's owned-and-operated stations, TCN Sydney, GTV Melbourne, QTQ Brisbane, NWS Adelaide, STW Perth, NTD Darwin and NBN Northern New South Wales. 9HD programming was also carried via WIN Corporation's regional stations RTQ Queensland, WIN Southern New South Wales, VTV Victoria and TVT Tasmania as "WIN HD". 9HD was not carried by regional affiliates Southern Cross in Spencer Gulf & Broken Hill or Imparja Television.

Revival channel
Upon its revival on 26 November 2015, 9HD returned to 1080i50 high definition, but was broadcast in MPEG-4 format as opposed to the standard MPEG-2 format. 9HD covered all Nine-owned metropolitan stations as well as its Darwin station. Nine's regional station NBN launched 9HD on 1 March 2016.

Regional affiliate WIN Television announced on 10 February 2016 it would launch its own HD simulcast in the coming months. It was later confirmed the HD simulcast would be titled WIN HD and would launch on 1 March 2016. Four WIN regions were excluded from the 1 March launch date. Griffith, Tasmania, and Eastern South Australia did not receive the channel until 2 March 2016 due to technical issues. In addition, the Regional WA station did not launch the channel until 10 March 2016.

Upon the media shakeup on 1 July 2016, WIN lost its Nine affiliation in favour of Southern Cross Austereo. As such, WIN HD switched its feed to the 10HD feed in all WIN markets. Southern Cross then took over the Nine affiliation in Queensland, Southern NSW, Victoria, Spencer Gulf, SA and Broken Hill, NSW. In these areas except Spencer Gulf, SA and Broken Hill, NSW, 9HD became available from 1 July 2016, over a month earlier from the original mid-August expectation that cited the time consumption of installing new broadcasting equipment. 9HD also became available in Tasmania on 1 July 2016 when the joint venture station TDT changed its affiliation from Ten to Nine.

As of 2021, no plans were announced yet in launching the channel in Remote Central & Eastern Australia.

As WIN re-affiliated to Nine on 1 July 2021, WIN HD  now uses 9HD’s feed.

Identity
Originally the logo was only displayed in place of the standard Nine Network logo when native HD programming replaced upscaled material, and switched from "HDTV" to "HIGH DEFINITION" in 2003.  When the network dropped the dots from their logo, a more custom design was deployed.  When 9HD's breakaway service was launched in 2008, the logo became a permanent fixture even on upscaled material, and used the Nine Network's nine dot logo with "HD" in a circle beside the numeral 9. The on-air look featured a dark look inside one of the 3D discs used in the 2008 logo. The slogan accompanying 9HD promotions was "You're Watching 9HD", which was replaced by " Choose Nine" and "Welcome Home", the same slogan as the primary channel, after breakaway programming ceased on 2 August 2009. An updated logo introduced when broadcast recommenced on 26 November 2015, accompanied by the slogan "Crystal Clear".

Slogan
17 March 2008 – 3 August 2009: You're Watching Nine HD
26 November 2015 – 23 December 2017: Crystal Clear
24 December 2017 – 7 November 2021: We Are The One
7 November 2021 – present: Still The One

See also

List of digital television channels in Australia
High-definition television in Australia

References

Nine Network
English-language television stations in Australia
Television channels and stations established in 2001
Television channels and stations disestablished in 2010
Television channels and stations established in 2015
2015 establishments in Australia
Digital terrestrial television in Australia
High-definition television